Neuberg Abbey is a former Cistercian monastery in Neuberg an der Mürz in Styria, Austria, and is one of the few extant set of monastic buildings in Austria to have retained its medieval character to any great extent.

History
The abbey was founded in 1327 as a filial monastery of Stift Heiligenkreuz by the Habsburg Duke Otto the Merry, who died here in 1339. It was suppressed in 1786 by Emperor Joseph II. In 1850, the partly ruined premises were converted for use as a hunting lodge for Emperor Franz Joseph I. The buildings were later owned by the Austrian Forestry Department, until 2006.

Abbey church
Construction on the monumental High Gothic hall church began about 1330 and was not completed until the reign of Frederick III, in 1496. The roof-timbers from the first half of the 15th century contain more than 1100 m³ of larch wood and constitute the largest and most important construction of this sort in the German-speaking world. The church interior is dominated by the Baroque high altar, dating from 1612. The life-size sandstone statue of the "Neuberger Madonna" and several side-altars date from the Gothic period.

After the dissolution of the monastery, it became the parish church of Neuberg.

Other architecture
The cloisters and the chapter house contain precious reliefs, which are among the most important specimens of 14th-century sculpture in Austria.

Cistercian monasteries in Austria
1327 establishments in Europe
Religious organizations established in the 1320s
Christian monasteries established in the 14th century
Monasteries in Styria
Establishments in the Duchy of Styria